Sankardev Shishu Niketan, Mangaldai is a well known school located in Baruapara, Ward No.4, Mangaldai Darrang District, Assam. This school is run by the Shishu Shiksha Samiti, Assam; a state-level affiliate committee of Vidya Bharati.

Faculty
18 teachers, two office assistants, more than 400 students

References

High schools and secondary schools in Assam
Educational institutions established in 1993
1993 establishments in Assam